NMRKV College for Women, is a women's general degree college located at Jayanagar, Bangalore, Karnataka. It is established in the year 1973. The college is affiliated with Bangalore University. This college offers different undergraduate and postgraduate courses in arts, science and commerce.

Departments

Science

Physics
Chemistry
Mathematics
Botany
Zoology
Electronics
Biotechnology
Computer Science

Arts and Commerce

Kannada
English
History
Political Science
Sociology
Economics
Psychology
Journalism
Business Administration
Commerce

Accreditation
The college is  recognized by the University Grants Commission (UGC).

References

External links

Women's universities and colleges in Karnataka
Educational institutions established in 1973
1973 establishments in Karnataka
Colleges affiliated to Bangalore University
Colleges in Bangalore